Robin Zentner (born 28 October 1994) is a German footballer who plays as a goalkeeper for Bundesliga club Mainz 05.

Career

Zentner played for SpVgg Eltville until 2006, when he joined the youth team at 1. FSV Mainz 05. There, from 2012 until 2015, he was active in the Mainz team. Beginning in the 2014/15 season, he moved up to the senior squad as their third goalkeeper. In August 2015, he was loaned to then third-division Holstein Kiel, a loan deal which was extended for the subsequent 2016/17 season. He played 26 times across two seasons in Northern Germany before returning to Mainz in 2017/18.

He returned to Mainz 05 for the 2017/18 season and played his first competitive game for the first team in October 2017. In one of his appearances, on November 4, 2017, against Borussia Mönchengladbach, he went viral for an "air kick" after mistaking the penalty spot for the ball following a back-pass, which nearly resulted in a goal. For each of his first two seasons back from loan, he alternated with Florian Müller as the starting goalkeeper of the until he earned the starting job towards the beginning of the first half of the 2019/20 season. He suffered a torn cruciate ligament on March 8, 2020, in a Bundesliga match and missed the remainder of the season. He was named the undisputed starting goalkeeper at Mainz beginning in the 2020/21 season with Müller moving on to SC Freiburg. His contract with Mainz runs until the end of the 2022/23 season.

References

External links

 Profile at the 1. FSV Mainz 05 website 
 

German footballers
Living people
1994 births
People from Rheingau-Taunus-Kreis
Sportspeople from Darmstadt (region)
Association football goalkeepers
1. FSV Mainz 05 players
1. FSV Mainz 05 II players
Holstein Kiel players
3. Liga players
Bundesliga players
Footballers from Hesse